Afghanistan and Poland established diplomatic relations in 1928. Afghanistan has an embassy in Warsaw.

History

Modern relations between Afghanistan and Poland dated back from 20th century, when King Amanullah Khan visited Poland at 1928 and received a warm welcome from the Polish Government. This subsequently gave Afghanistan and Poland its full diplomatic relations. However, relations were later severed after the World War II and later Cold War, in which both had little to no formal connection.

At 1980s, during the Soviet–Afghan War, Poland as part of communist Eastern Bloc sided with the Soviet Union, but on the same time, growing Solidarity movement in Poland and strong anti-Soviet resistance led by Ahmad Shah Massoud were instrumental on causing the collapse of the communist world and the fall of USSR. Poles showed great support and solidarity toward Afghans against the USSR.

Modern

At 1990s, Poland showed support to Ahmad Shah Massoud-led Northern Alliance to fight the Taliban. Shah Massoud also had an interview with a number of Poles, including Piotr Balcerowicz, the last to give interview to him before his death. Polish intelligence led by Alexander Makowski, assisted by anti-Taliban militias in Afghanistan, also helped discovering the existence of Osama Bin Laden and had urged the CIA to kill him at 1999, but the CIA rejected and thus, had missed the chance. The failed attempt was believed to had played a role leading to September 11 attacks by Bin Laden to the U.S. to growing anti-Western sentiment in Muslim world, which Makowski contributed to the missed opportunity to eliminate Bin Laden's threat at 1999.

Poland also contributed troops to Afghanistan in the subsequent Afghan War after the collapse of Taliban rule as part of NATO mission to the country. The Poles were able to win supports from Afghan locals, but it was hampered by American futile efforts in the war. However, due to the cost of the war, sometimes it was referred as Poland's "Vietnam Syndrome" because of incidents like Nangar Khel incident. In October 2012, Afghanistan gave back to Poland one of the country's original Renault FT-17 tanks that had been captured by the Soviets in the Polish-Soviet War and subsequently gifted to the Kingdom of Afghanistan.

See also
Nangar Khel incident

References

External links
Embassy of the Islamic Republic of Afghanistan in Warsaw
Embassy of the Republic of Poland in Kabul

 
Poland
Bilateral relations of Poland